Thyatira is a genus of moths belonging to the subfamily Thyatirinae of the Drepanidae. It was erected by Ferdinand Ochsenheimer in 1816.

Species
 Thyatira batis (Linnaeus, 1758)
 Thyatira bodemeyeri Bang-Haas, 1934
 Thyatira brasiliensis Werny, 1966
 Thyatira casta Felder, 1874
 Thyatira cognata Warren, 1888
 Thyatira delattini (Werny, 1966)
 Thyatira dysimata West, 1932
 Thyatira florina (Gaede, 1930)
 Thyatira hedemanni (Christoph, 1885)
 Thyatira mexicana Edwards, 1884
 Thyatira philippina Laszlo, G. Ronkay, L. Ronkay & Witt, 2007
 Thyatira staphyla Dognin, 1890
 Thyatira tama Schaus, 1933
 Thyatira vicina Guenée, 1852

Former species
 Thyatira rubrescens Werny, 1966

References

Thyatirinae
Drepanidae genera